SGD is the ISO 4217 code of the Singapore dollar, the currency of Singapore.

SGD or sgd can also mean:
 Saccharomyces Genome Database, a yeast database
 Sargodha, a Pakistani city
 Secure global desktop, software by Tarantella, subsequently bought and used by Sun Microsystems and by Oracle Corporation
 SG Dynamo Dresden, a German association-football club
 Sliding glass door, a type of sliding door
 Smart Grid Device, an electronic device for smart grids
 Sønderborg Airport (IATA code SGD)
 Spanish Gangster Disciples, an American gang
 Stars Go Dim, an American pop-rock band
 Stochastic gradient descent, an optimization algorithm
 Submarine groundwater discharge, freshwater aquifer seepage into oceans
 Surigaonon language, based on its ISO 639-3 code sgd